Akko dionaea, the Atlantic specter goby, is a species of gobies native to the Amazon basin and Colombia. It inhabits black mud at ca. 20 m depth.

References

dioaea
Fish described in 1995